Zinc finger protein 649 is a protein that in humans is encoded by the ZNF649 gene on Human Chromozone 19 containing 5 exons.

References

Further reading

External links 
 

Transcription factors